Chirantan Das is an Indian cinematographer associated with Tanu Weds Manu, Tere Naal Love Ho Gaya, Sanam Teri Kasam and Dhanak. Chirantan, who did cinematography for 31 films, won the Apsara award of best cinematography for film Tanu Weds Manu in 2012.

Career 

Chirantan is cinematographer of 31 movies including some critically acclaimed films like Sankat City (2009), Tanu Weds Manu (2011), Tere Naal Love Ho Gaya (2012), Dhanak (2015) and Sanam Teri Kasam (2012). Chirantan also worked as camera operator in the Bollywood.

Filmography

References 

Living people
Year of birth missing (living people)
Indian cinematographers